Hundal is a surname. Notable people with the surname include:

Avantika Hundal, Indian actress
Shaan Hundal (born 1999), Canadian soccer player 
Simranjit Singh Hundal, Indian film director and writer
Sunny Hundal (born 1977), British journalist, blogger and academic
Tej Hundal (born 1974), singer-songwriter